Anthony Kasandwe (born 2 September 1969) is a Zambian politician. Kasandwe is a member of the ruling Patriotic Front. He has been serving as a Member of the National Assembly of Zambia for Bangweulu since 2015, when he won a by-election.

Biography
Kasandwe was born on 2 September 1969. He holds an advanced diploma in business administration, a bachelor of arts in developmental studies and a diploma in philosophy and religious studies.

Kasandwe is a member of the Patriotic Front. In 2015, President Edgar Lungu announced Kasandwe as the PF's by-election candidate for Bangweulu. The by-election was called after incumbent MP Chifita Matafwali died. Kasandwe won the seat on 6 August 2015 after receiving 9,516 votes versus 1,862 votes for his closest competitor. He won a full term in the 2016 general election.

Kasandwe is married.

References

Living people
1969 births
Patriotic Front (Zambia) politicians
Members of the National Assembly of Zambia